John Idington (October 14, 1840 – February 7, 1928) was a Canadian justice of the Supreme Court of Canada.

Born in Puslinch, Upper Canada (now Ontario), the son of Peter Idington and Catherine Stewart, he received his LL.B degree from the University of Toronto and was called to the Ontario Bar, both in 1864. He practised law in Stratford, Canada West (now Ontario) for forty years.

He was created a provincial QC in 1876 and a dominion QC in 1885.

In 1904, he was appointed to the High Court of Justice of Ontario and he was appointed by Wilfrid Laurier to the Supreme Court on February 10, 1905. In 1924, following the death of Sir Louis Henry Davies, Idington was passed over for the position of Chief Justice of Canada, even though he was the senior Pusine Justice on the Court.

His notable decisions include his dissent in Quong Wing v. R., in which he disagreed with the effects of racist legislation, on the basis that the use of the term "Chinaman" could not have been meant to refer to naturalized Canadians of Chinese origin.

He retired on March 31, 1927, at age 86, after legislation was passed requiring a mandatory retirement age of 75.

References

External links
 
 Supreme Court of Canada biography
 

Justices of the Supreme Court of Canada
Lawyers in Ontario
Canadian King's Counsel
People from Wellington County, Ontario
University of Toronto alumni
1840 births
1928 deaths
University of Toronto Faculty of Law alumni